Portrait of a Lady, formerly known as Portrait of Guilia Gonzaga, is an oil painting by, or possibly after, Titian. It is dated, broadly, to the period 1525–1565. The painting is in the collection of the Art Institute of Chicago.

Description 
The attribution of this picture is uncertain, although it has long been associated with Titian. It is related to La Bella and Girl in a Fur. It has usually been entitled Portrait of Guilia Gonzaga, but the identification with the Italian noblewoman of that name is no longer accepted; it is now entitled simply Portrait of a Lady.

Condition 
The painting is in poor condition, and was cleaned of earlier inpainting in the 1960s. Some paint and ground has been lost in the upper background and in the sitter's hair. The surface of the paint is abraded in places in the background, on the left side of the sitter's face, and on her bosom.

Provenance 
 Private Collection, Italy.
 Sold by Böhler and Steinmeyer, New York, to Max Epstein (died 1954), Chicago, between 1928 and 1930.
 Bequeathed to the Art Institute of Chicago, 1954.

Versions 
There is one other version in a private collection in Italy, and there is a copy of the Chicago portrait in the Museo Cerralbo in Madrid.

References

Sources 

 Berenson, Bernard (1957). Italian Pictures of the Renaissance: Venetian School. Vol. 1. London: Phaidon Press. p. 184.
 Lloyd, Christopher (1993). Italian Paintings before 1600 in the Art Institute of Chicago: A Catalogue of the Collection. Chicago. pp. 246–248, ill.
 Wethey, Harold E. (1971). The Paintings of Titian: Complete Edition. Vol. 2: The Portraits. London: Phaidon Press. p. 169, no. X-60.
 Paintings in the Art Institute of Chicago: A Catalogue of the Picture Collection. Chicago, 1961. p. 451.
 The Art News, 28(18). New York. 1 February 1930. p. 3, ill.
 "Portrait of a Lady". The Art Institute of Chicago. Retrieved 25 October 2022.
 "Sabbioneta celebra la bellezza, nel segno di Giulia Gonzaga". Oglio Po News. 23 August 2013. Retrieved 25 October 2022.
 "VH 0473". Museo Cerralbo. Retrieved 25 October 2022.

Portraits by Titian
Paintings in the collection of the Art Institute of Chicago
16th-century paintings